Okky Ayudhia Lukman or better known as Okky Lukman (born in Jakarta, Indonesia on August 25, 1984) is an Indonesian actress, comedian and presenter of Minangkabau descent.

Career
Okky became known after starring in Lenong Bocah from 1993-1998. His chubby appearance, chatty conversational style and original way of speaking immediately attracted the attention of viewers. Prior to joining Lenong Boy, he appeared in several soap operas including, Okky in "TVRI". Aditya Gumay, leader Ananda Studio and Lenong boy, who saw great talent within Oki. From there anyway Oki then involved in staging "Lenong Boy" broadcast on a television station. Oki now also venturing into the world of soap operas and television host.

Television
 Lenong Bocah
 Jinny Oh Jinny
 Wah Cantiknya
 Norak Tapi Beken
 Annie Van Jogja
 Funtastik
 Ketok Pintu
 Dangdut Mania
Kring Kring Olala
 New Prime Time
 Cucu (Cuplikan Lucu)
Idola Cilik 1-3
Dahsyat
Pacar Pertama
Derings
Tarung Dangdut
Pagi Pagi Bagi Bagi
 Kontes Dangdut Indonesia 2014
 D'Academy 4
Ceplas Ceplos
Lenong Rempong
Happy Show 
Improvisasi Selebriti 
Mari Kita Sahur
 Keluarga Gunarso  
 Mikrofon Pelunas Utang
 The OK! Show
 Kilau DMD
 E-Talkshow
 I Can See Your Voice Indonesia 5
 The Voice Kids Indonesia 4
 Mikrofon Impian
 Arisan
 The New Eat Bulaga! Indonesia

Commercials
 KFC (1997)
 Coca-Cola (1999)
 Tropicool (1999)
 Trenz (2000)
 Citra Body Lotion (2000)
 Pizza Hut (2001)
 Indomie (2001), With Chairul Tanjung and Jovanka Mardova
 Esia (2007)
 Okky Jelly Drink (2009)
 Pamol (2010)
 Motor Suzuki (2008)

Awards and nominations

References

External links
 Okky Lukman Profile Website

1984 births
Actresses from Jakarta
Indonesian film actresses
Living people